The women's 100 metres hurdles event at the 2019 Summer Universiade was held on 10 and 11 July at the Stadio San Paolo in Naples.

Medalists

Results

Heats
Qualification: First 3 in each heat (Q) and next 4 fastest (q) qualified for the semifinals.

Wind:Heat 1: +2.8 m/s, Heat 2: -1.4 m/s, Heat 3: -0.5 m/s, Heat 4: +1.8 m/s

Semifinals
Qualification: First 3 in each heat (Q) and next 2 fastest (q) qualified for the final.

Wind:Heat 1: -0.2 m/s, Heat 2: -0.6 m/s

Final

Wind: +0.6 m/s

References

100
2019